Bohumil "Bo" Brhel is a Czech speedway rider and he won the  2001 Individual European Champion title. He won the Czechoslovakian title on six occasions

Career

World Final Appearances
 1989 -  Munich, Olympic Stadium - 16th - 1pt
1994 -  Vojens, Vojens Speedway Center - 10th - 6pts

Speedway Grand Prix

World (European) Under-21 Championship
 1986  Rivne - 4th - 10pts

Speedway World Team Cup
 1990 -  Pardubice - 4th - 19pts (6)
 1999 -  Pardubice - 2nd - 35pts (9)

Speedway World Cup
 2002 -  Peterborough, East of England Showground - 5th - 36pts (5)

Speedway World Pairs Championship
 1989 -  Leszno, Alfred Smoczyk Stadium (with Zdeněk Tesař) - 7th - 25pts (14)
 1991 -  Poznań, Olimpia Poznań Stadium (with Roman Matoušek) - 5th 18pts (12)

Individual European Championship
 2001 -  Heusden-Zolder, Heusden-Zolder Speedway - Winner - 14pts
 2002 -  Rybnik, Rybnik Municipal Stadium - 5th - 10pts

European Pairs Championship
 2004 - Winner - 28pts (16)
 2005 - 2nd - 27pts (13+4)
 2006 - 4th - 15pts (0)

European Club Champions' Cup
 1998 - 2nd - 36pts (9)
 2004 - 4th - 42pts (12)

Individual Czechoslovakian Championship
 1986 - 15th - 17pts
 1987 - 16th - 19pts
 1988 - 6th - 53pts
 1989 - 4th - 61pts
 1991 - 2nd - 14pts

Individual Czech Republic Championship
 1992 - Winner - 15pts
 1993 - Winner - 14pts
 1994 - 4th - 11pts + 2pts
 1995 - 10 - 6pts
 1996 - 3rd - 13pts + 1pt
 1997 - 2nd - 13pts + 1pts
 1998 - Winner - 14pts
 1999 - 3rd - 12pts
 2000 - Winner - 50pts
 2001 - Winner - 75pts
 2002 - 2nd - 14pts + 2pts
 2004 - Winner - 14pts + 3pts

Individual Junior Czechoslovakian Championship
 1983 - 16th - 32pts
 1985 - Winner - 43pts

World Longtrack Final

One Day Final
 1994  Marianske Lazne (8th) 9pts
 1995  Scheessel (5th) 17pts
 1996  Herxheim (14th) 5pts

Grand-Prix-Series
 1997 5 app (12th) 43pts

See also
List of Speedway Grand Prix riders
Czech Republic speedway team

References 

Living people
Czechoslovak speedway riders
Czech speedway riders
Individual Speedway European Champions
European Pairs Speedway Champions
Individual Speedway Long Track World Championship riders
1965 births
Oxford Cheetahs riders
Sportspeople from Zlín